Claustrophobia is a 2008 Hong Kong romantic drama film written and directed by Ivy Ho in her directorial debut, and starring Karena Lam and Ekin Cheng.

Synopsis
Pearl (Karena Lam) has quietly fallen in love with her boss Tom (Ekin Cheng), who's married with a family. Without warning, Tom asks Pearl to interview for another job. Wounded, Pearl demands that Tom terminate her. The gauntlet has been thrown down. In a space as small, crowded and claustrophobic as the office, love doesn't grow - it incubates and breeds, like a virus.

Cast
 Karena Lam as Pearl
 Ekin Cheng as Tom
 Felix Lok as Karl
 Derek Tsang as John
 Chucky Woo as Jewel
 Eric Tsang as Dr. Chiu
 Andy Hui as Ken
 Siu Miu-yin as Dr. Chiu's nurse
 Cary Cheng as Dr. Chiu's patient
 Ben Wong as Michael
 Dhillion Harit Singh as Lift passenger
 Zhou Ji-cheng as Lift passenger
 D.S.F. Chow as Pier hand
 Cheung Yat-fei as Man at restaurant
 Lulu Wong as Girl at restaurant
 Pancy Chan as Yvonne
 Allie Poon as Bianca
 Kong Ka-yin as Rollerblading girl
 Choy Ka-chai as Rollerblading guy
 Wong Kin-ko as Woman in conference room
 Yeung Chiu-hoi as Man in TV commercial
 Iris Ngai as Girl in TV commercial

Release
 Tokyo International Film Festival 23 October 2008 
 Hong Kong Asian Film Festival 26 October 2008
 Berlin International Film Festival 10 February 2009 
 Hong Kong Wide Release 12 February 2009 
 San Francisco International Film Festival May 2009

Awards and nominations

References

External links
 
 Claustrophobia at the Hong Kong Movie Database
 Claustrophobia at the Hong Kong Cinemagic

2008 films
2008 romantic drama films
Hong Kong romantic drama films
2000s Cantonese-language films
Films set in Hong Kong
Films shot in Hong Kong
2008 directorial debut films
2000s Hong Kong films